Oliver Mohr (born January 23, 1992) is an Austrian footballer who currently plays as a defender for FCM Traiskirchen.

References

External links
 
 bundesliga.at profile 
 

1992 births
Living people
Austrian footballers
SK Rapid Wien players
Floridsdorfer AC players
SV Horn players
2. Liga (Austria) players
Austrian Regionalliga players
Association football defenders